India's Next Superstars is an Indian talent search reality television show which aired on Star Plus and streamed on Hotstar. It was judged by Karan Johar and Rohit Shetty. Aman Gandotra and Natasha Bharadwaj were declared as winners, while Shruti Sharma was the first runner up and awarded the special title of ‘Third Superstar’. Naina Singh, Ashish Mehrotra, and Harshvardhan Deo were the other runner ups.
But till now none of the winners got any project which they were promised.

Concept 
Ten males and ten females live together and are judged on the basis of their performances in acting and dancing assignments, with contestants eliminated every other episode. Two males and two females join in the middle of the competition as wild-card contestants. The two winners receive a three-film deal with Dharma Productions. Though they were promised main role in Dharma productions movies they never got any project and were basically cheated.

Contestants

Guests
 Episodes 1–2 – Priyanka Chopra
 Episodes 3–4 – Sidharth Malhotra
 Episodes 5–6 – Kangana Ranaut
 Episodes 9–10 – Kartik Aaryan, Nushrat Bharucha and Sunny Singh
 Episodes 13–14 – Sonakshi Sinha and Dhvani Bhanushali
 Episode 18 – Urvashi Rautela
 Episode 19 – Shreyas Talpade
 Episode 22 – Tiger Shroff
 Finale – Badshah

Scoring Chart 

 Male
 Female
 Immune
 Eliminated
 Danger Zone
 Non Elimination Bottom
 Runner Up
 Winner

In episode 3–4, the contestants were judged on 10 points.
In episode 11 onwards, the contestants were judged on 10 points on their acting and 5 points on their dance performance.
In episode 15–16 there were 4 wild-card entries introduced: Harshvardhan Deo, Tapan Singh, Elisha Mayor, and Simran Choudhary. They made an acting performance but no dance performance, and were not scored by the judges.
In episode 21–22, there was no elimination. Ashish Mehrotra and Naina Singh were to be eliminated but the judges declared it a non-elimination week.

References

External links
 India's Next Superstars Streaming on Hotstar

2018 Indian television series debuts
Hindi-language television shows
Indian reality television series
StarPlus original programming